Belloy-Saint-Léonard is a commune in the Somme département in Hauts-de-France, which is situated in northern France.

Geography

Population

Personalities
 Philippe Leclerc de Hauteclocque, Marshal of France, born in Belloy-Saint-Léonard, 22 November 1902.

See also
Communes of the Somme department

References

Communes of Somme (department)
Somme communes articles needing translation from French Wikipedia